Carl David Hedelin (born March 16, 1991) is a Swedish-born American football offensive tackle who is currently a free agent. He played club football for Swedish team Tyresö Royal Crowns and college football at Purdue University.

College career 
Hedelin played at the City College of San Francisco in 2012 and 2013. After the 2013 season, Hedelin accepted a scholarship to continue playing football for the Purdue Boilermakers football team. Hedelin was suspended by the NCAA during the first 3 games of his Purdue career, due to his playing for the Valencia Firebats of Liga Nacional de Fútbol Americano.

Professional career 
In the 2016 draft, Hedelin went undrafted but was later signed as an undrafted free agent by the Dallas Cowboys. He was waived on July 26, 2016.

References 

1991 births
Living people
Purdue Boilermakers football players
Sportspeople from Stockholm
Swedish players of American football
City College of San Francisco Rams football players